Cluan is a rural locality in the local government area of Meander Valley in the Launceston region of Tasmania. The 2016 census determined a population of 39 for the state suburb of Cluan.

History
Cluan was gazetted as a locality in 1968.

Geography
The watershed of the Cluan Tiers forms the south-western boundary.

Road infrastructure
The C505 route (Cluan Road) passes through from north-east to south-east. The C510 route (Glenore Road) starts at an intersection with C505 and exits to the north-east.

References

Localities of Meander Valley Council
Towns in Tasmania